Vidhubala (born 24 May 1952) is an Indian actress who started her career in the mid-1960s and retired from the industry in 1981. She is well known for hosting the family reality show Kadhayallithu Jeevitham in Amrita TV spanning for 10 years. She has acted in advertisements also.

Acting career
Vidhubala acted in over 100 Malayalam films. Her first movie was School Master, in 1963,which she acted as a Child Artist. She made her debut as a heroine  in Taxicar, 1971,with evergreen hero prem nazir, she made her debut as the lead heroine opposite Vincent  in K. S Sethumadhavan's Manushya Puthran 1973. Vidhubala acted opposite many of the leading actors of her time, including Prem Nazir, Madhu, Vincent, Mohan, Jayan, Soman, and Kamal Haasan. She quit acting in 1981. Her last film was Nithyavasantham, directed by I. V Sasi, With her favorite actor Prem Nazir.

Personal life

Vidhubala was born to Indian independence activists K. Bhagyanath and Sulochana on 24 May 1952. Her father was also a famed magician. She took to acting with the interest with Prem Nazir films. She is the sister of cinematographer Madhu Ambat. She is married to Murali Kumar, who was the producer of some of her films and together the couple has a son named Arjun Kumar.

Awards
Kerala State Television Awards 2017 - Best Anchor : Kadhayallithu Jeevitham

Filmography

Malayalam

Ente Gramam (1984)
Abhinayam (1981) as Radha
Pratishodh (1980)
 Pappu (1980) as Cameo as herself
Sooryadhaham (1980)
Aarohanam (1980) as Mini
Seetha (1980)
Kaivarikal Thiriyumbol (1979)Ezhamkadalinakkare (1979) as LindaSarppam (1979) as LathaAjnatha Theerangal (1979) as KavithaSandhyaragam (1979)Anyarude Bhoomi (1979)Nithya Vasantham (1979)Hridayathil Nee Matrem (1979)Radha Enna Penkutti (1979)Rakthamillatha Manushyan (1979) as SophieEzhu Nirangal (1979) as SharadaPratheeksha (1979)Jimmy (1979) as MarykuttyManushyan (1979)Vadaka Veedu (1979)Valeduthavan Valal (1979)Lajjavathi (1979)Amritha Chumbanam (1979)Agni (1978)Amarsham (1978)Avalkku Maranamilla (1978)Iniyum Puzha Ozhukum (1978) as RadhaAnumodhanam (1978)Ninaku Njanum enikku Neeyum (1978) as SaraswathiEe Manohara Theeram (1978) as GeethaAshwathama (1978)Lisa (1978) as KalaYagaswam (1978) as NandhiniRappadikalude Gaatha (1978)Sthree Oru Dukham (1978)Kaathirunna Nimisham (1978) as SumathiManoradham (1978)Society Lady (1978)Pichippoo (1978)Vishwaroopam (1978)Raju Rahim (1978) as ShobhaAashirvadam (1977)Akale Akasham (1977)Santha Oru Devatha (1977)
Vishukkani (1977) as Radhika
Muttathe Mulla (1977) as Geetha
Aaradhana (1977) as Radha
Shankupushpam (1977) as Devi
Amme Anupame (1977)
Ormakal Marikkumo (1977) as Parvathi
Ashta Maangalyam (1977)
Harshabaspam (1977) as Bindhu
Innale Innu (1977)
Minimol (1977) ... Usha
Yatheem (1977)... Sainaba
Panchamritham (1977)
Sakhakkale Munnottu (1977)
Saritha (1977)
Sneham (1977)
Taxi Driver (1977)
Thuruppugulan (1977)
Itha Ivide Vare (1977) as Susheela
Veedu Oru swargam (1977)
Dheere Sameere Yamuna Theere (1977)Chirikudukka (1976) as RadhaKanyadhanam (1976)Sindhu (1976) as GeethaMissi (1976)Mohiniyattam (1976) as NirmalaParijatham (1976)Pickpocket (1976) as ReenaRajayogam (1976)YudhaBhoomi (1976)Njaaval Pazhangal (1976)Theekkanal (1976)Kuttavum Shikshayum (1976)Ajayanum Vijayanum (1976)Thomashleeha (1975)Pravaham (1975) as GirijaBoy Friend (1975)Sindhu (1975) as GeethaKuttichathan (1975)Alibabyum 41 Kallamarum (1975) as LailaLove Letter (1975)Chandana Chola (1975)Kalyana Panthal (1975)Chuvanna Sandhyakal (1975) as RosiRajhamsam (1974)Bhoomi Devi Puspiniyayai (1974) as JayaManushyaputran (1974) as AmmuCollege Girl (1974) as RadhaManushyaputhran (1973) as AmmuTaxi Car (1972)Ummachu (1971)Virunnukari (1969) as MohanamPavappettaval (1967) as RadhaJeevikkan Anuvadikku (1967)School Master (1964) as Vishalam (Child Artist)

TamilAyiram Jenmangal Nee Ennakku (1972)Velli Vizha (1972)Avanai Sutri Ponnukku Thanga Manasu (1973) as GeethaEngamma Sapatham (1974) Murugan Kaattiya Vazhi (1974)Samarpanam (1974) as LakshmiEnakkoru Magan Pirappan (1975)Kasthuri Vijayam (1975)Rasi Nalla Rasi (1977) Unnai Suttrum Ulagam (1977) as SeethaNee oru Natchathiram (1978)Ore Vaanam Ore Bhoomi (1979) as Latha

As a Dubbing ArtistOppolThrishnaSringaramNaalu Pennungal''

Television 
 
 Vidhubala is well known for her anchoring style.

References

External links

Actresses from Kozhikode
Actresses in Malayalam cinema
Indian film actresses
Living people
1954 births
Actresses in Tamil cinema
Indian voice actresses
20th-century Indian actresses